San Perlita Independent School District is a public school district based in San Perlita, Texas (USA).

In addition to San Perlita, the district also serves the community of Port Mansfield.

San Perlita ISD has three campuses - San Perlita High (Grades 9-12), San Perlita Middle (Grades 6-8), and San Perlita Elementary (Grades PK-5).

In 2009, the school district was rated "recognized" by the Texas Education Agency.

References

External links
 

School districts in Willacy County, Texas